The 2011 FIA Alternative Energies Cup was a season of the FIA Alternative Energies Cup, a world championship for vehicles with alternative energy propulsion organized by the Fédération Internationale de l'Automobile. The season had eight rallies, beginning with Rally Montecarlo on 3 April.

For the final classifications, 50% rounded up of the best results plus one was taken into account.

Calendar and winners cat. VII & VIII

Driver Standings cat. VII & VIII

Co-Driver Standings cat. VII & VIII

Manufacturer Standings cat. VII & VIII

References

FIA E-Rally Regularity Cup seasons
Fia Alternative Energies Cup